The 2019 Fenland District Council election took place on 2 May 2019 for all 39 seats of the Fenland District Council in England. It was held on the same day as other local elections.

In these elections, twelve councillors were returned unopposed, with Fenland District Council topping the Electoral Reform Society's list of 'rotten boroughs'.

Summary

Background

In recent months a number of prominent Tories had failed to win selection for wards they had held in many instances for several years. Some of these stood as independent candidates. Nick Meekins standing as an independent took David Oliver's seat. Cllr Michelle Tanfield retained her Elm and Christchurch seat along with Will Sutton as independents.

UKIP did not put up any candidates this election - former UKIP county councillor for Wisbech North ward (2013-2017), Paul Clapp said he felt he could "achieve more outside of the political system than in it". The local Green Party said it had "pushed hard" to field more candidates, but found "limited interest". The Labour candidate Martin Field (March East ward), felt uncontested seats were "bad for democracy". Labour had not a candidate standing in every seat in Fenland since 1995. Liberal Democrat candidate (Parson Drove & Wisbech St Mary), Gavin Booth said: "The state of national politics now puts people off and this has caused a lot of apathy for local politics, which is a shame."

Two Independent councillors Virginia and Michael Bucknor stepped down, after 12 years in local politics, due to Mrs Bucknor's ill health. A former conservative councillor Andy Maul took one of the two seats they were vacating. A number of former Tory councillors standing as independents gained seats across the district, collectively they are forming the largest opposition for many years.

Election result

|-

Ward results

12 seats were uncontested.
(* denotes sitting councillor)

Bassenhally (Whittlesey)

Benwick, Coates and Eastrea

Birch (Chatteris)

Clarkson (Wisbech)

Doddington and Wimblington

Elm and Christchurch

Kirkgate (Wisbech)

Lattersey (Whittlesey)

Manea

March East

March North

March West

Medworth (Wisbech)

Octavia Hill (Wisbech)

Parson Drove and Wisbech St Mary

Peckover (Wisbech) 

Nick Meekin rejoined the Conservatives in 2021.

Roman Bank

Slade Lode (Chatteris)

St Andrews (Whittlesey)

Staithe (Wisbech)

Stonald (Whittlesey)

The Mills (Chatteris)

Waterlees Village (Wisbech)

Wenneye (Chatteris)

References

2019 English local elections
May 2019 events in the United Kingdom
2019
2010s in Cambridgeshire